Husemersee (or Hausersee) is a lake at Ossingen in the Canton of Zurich, Switzerland.

At Husemersee, swimming is allowed on the western part of the lake. From Ossingen train station, the Husemersee can be reached in a 30mins walk.

References

External links
   water quality
Husemersee 

Husemer
Lakes of the canton of Zürich